An election was held on November 8, 2022, to elect all 120 members to North Carolina's House of Representatives. The election coincided with the elections for other offices, including the U.S Senate, U.S. House of Representatives, and state senate. The primary election was originally going to be held on March 8, 2022, with a run-off in June 2022, however the North Carolina Supreme Court delayed the primary until May 17, 2022, pending challenges over the State's districts and paused candidate filing. Prior to this pause, several candidates had already filed to run The elections will be held under new districts passed by the General Assembly in House Bill 976 to account for population changes following the 2020 census. The maps were later overturned by the North Carolina Supreme Court, who ordered the legislature to draw new maps. The North Carolina General Assembly later redrew the maps (House Bill 980) which were upheld by the Wake County Superior Court and the North Carolina Supreme Court. Candidate filing resumed on February 24, 2022 and concluded on March 4, 2022.

Predictions

Results summary

Close races
Districts where the margin of victory was under 10%:

Incumbents defeated in primaries

Republicans
District 52: Jamie Boles lost renomination to fellow incumbent Ben Moss in a redistricting race.
District 70: Pat Hurley lost renomination to Brian Biggs.
District 113: David Rogers lost renomination to fellow incumbent Jake Johnson in a redistricting race.

Incumbents defeated in the general election
Larry Yarborough (R-District 2), defeated by Ray Jeffers (D)
Howard Hunter III (D-District 5), defeated by Bill Ward (R)
Linda Cooper-Suggs (D-District 24), defeated by Ken Fontenot (R)
James Gailliard (D-District 25), defeated by Allen Chesser (R)
Terry Garrison (D-District 32), defeated by Frank Sossamon (R)
Ricky Hurtado (D-District 63), defeated by Stephen Ross (R)
Brian Farkas (D-District 9), defeated by Timothy Reeder (R)

Open seats that changed parties
Charles Graham (D-District 47) retired to run for Congress, seat won by Jarrod Lowrey (R)
Larry Pittman (R-District 73) retired, seat won by Diamond Staton-Williams (D)

Newly created seats
District 6 (Harnett County) won by Joe Pike (R)
District 21 (Wake County) won by Ya Liu (D)
District 66 (Wake County) won by Sarah Crawford (D)
District 83 (Cabarrus & Rowan Counties) won by Kevin Crutchfield (R)
District 112 (Mecklenburg County) won by Tricia Cotham (D)

Detailed results

Districts 1-19

District 1
The new 1st district includes the homes of incumbent Republicans Ed Goodwin, who has represented the 1st District since 2019, and Bobby Hanig, who has represented the 6th district since 2019. Hanig has announced that he will not seek re-election and instead he will run for the North Carolina Senate.

District 2
Incumbent Republican Larry Yarborough has represented the 2nd district since 2015.

District 3
Incumbent Republican Steve Tyson has represented the 3rd district since 2021. He is running for re-election.

District 4
Incumbent Republican Jimmy Dixon has represented the 4th district since 2011. He is running for re-election.

District 5
Incumbent Democratic Howard Hunter III has represented the 5th district since 2015. Bill Ward won the Republican nomination and then defeated Hunter in the general election.

District 6
The new 6th district is based in Harnett County and has no incumbent. Joe Pike won the Republican nomination, defeating Murray Simpkins. Pike won the Republican nomination and then easily won the general election.

District 7
Incumbent Republican Matthew Winslow has represented the 7th district since 2021.

District 8
Incumbent Democrat Kandie Smith has represented the 8th district since 2019. Smith is retiring to run for the North Carolina Senate. Sharon McDonald Evans and Gloristine Brown sought the Democratic nomination. Brown won the Democratic nomination.

District 9
Incumbent Democrat Brian Farkas has represented the 9th district since 2021. Timothy Reeder won the Republican nomination, defeating Tony Moore.

District 10
The new 10th district includes the homes of incumbent Republican Majority Leader John Bell, who has represented the 10th district since 2013, and incumbent Democrat Raymond Smith Jr., who has represented the 21st district since 2019. Smith is retiring to run for the North Carolina Senate

District 11
Incumbent Democrat Allison Dahle has represented the 11th district since 2019.

District 12
Incumbent Republican Chris Humphrey has represented the 12th district since 2019. He is running for re-election.

District 13
Incumbent Republican Pat McElraft has represented the 13th district since 2007. She is retiring. Celeste Cairns won the Republican nomination, defeating Pete Benton and Eden Gordon Hill.

District 14
Incumbent Republican George Cleveland has represented the 14th district since 2005. Debbie Burke is challenging Cleveland for the Republican nomination. Eric Whitfield and Isiah "Ike" Johnson are seeking the Democratic nomination.

District 15
Incumbent Republican Phil Shepard has represented the 15th district since 2011.

District 16
Incumbent Republican Carson Smith has represented the 16th district since 2019.

District 17
Incumbent Republican Frank Iler has represented the 17th district since 2009. Edward M. McKeithan and Eric Terashima are seeking the Democratic nomination.

District 18
Incumbent Democrat Deb Butler has represented the 18th district since 2017.

District 19
Incumbent Republican Charlie Miller has represented the 19th district since 2021.

Districts 20-39

District 20
Incumbent Republican Ted Davis Jr. has represented the 20th district and its predecessors since 2012.

District 21
The new 21st district is based in western Wake County and has no incumbent. Cary Town Council member Ya Liu won the open seat.

District 22
Incumbent Republican William Brisson has represented the 22nd district since 2007.

District 23
Incumbent Democrat Shelly Willingham has represented the 23rd district since 2015.

District 24
Incumbent Democrat Linda Cooper-Suggs has represented the 24th district since 2020. She lost re-election to Republican Ken Fontenot

District 25
Incumbent Democrat James Gailliard has represented the 25th district since 2019. Allen Chesser won the Republican nomination, defeating Alsey Beth Hopkins and Yvonne McLeod. Chesser then defeated Gailliard in the general election

District 26
Incumbent Republican Donna McDowell White has represented the 26th district since 2017. Rick Walker unsuccessfully challenged McDowell White for the Republican nomination.

District 27
Incumbent Democrat Michael Wray has represented the 27th district since 2005. Jerry McDaniel unsuccessfully challenged Wray for the Democratic nomination. Halifax County Sheriff Wes Tripp was unopposed for the Republican nomination.

District 28
Incumbent Republican Larry Strickland has represented the 28th district since 2017. James Davenport unsuccessfully challenged Strickland for the Republican nomination.

District 29
Incumbent Democrat Vernetta Alston has represented the 29th district since 2020.

District 30
Incumbent Democrat Marcia Morey has represented the 30th district since 2017.

District 31
Incumbent Democrat Zack Forde-Hawkins has represented the 31st district since 2019.

District 32
Incumbent Democrat Terry Garrison has represented the 32nd district since 2017. Garrison lost re-election to Republican Frank Sossamon.

District 33
Incumbent Democrat Rosa Gill has represented the 33rd district since 2009. Nate Blanton unsuccessfully challenged Gill for the Democratic nomination.

District 34
Incumbent Democrat Grier Martin had represented the 34th district since 2013, but he resigned on July 8, 2022 and ended his re-election campaign. Fellow Democrat Jack Nichols was appointed to finish the remainder of Martin's term. Zach Padgett was initially chosen to replace Martin on the ballot, but he later withdrew and was replaced by Tim Longest. Ashley Seshul defeated Joshua Jordan to win the Republican nomination. Longest won the open seat.

District 35
Incumbent Democrat Terence Everitt has represented the 35th district since 2019. Fred Von Canon won the Republican nomination, defeating Brandon Panameno.

District 36
Incumbent Democrat Julie von Haefen has represented the 36th district since 2019.

District 37
Incumbent Republican Erin Paré has represented the 37th district since 2021. Mary Bethel, Christine Kelly, and Elizabeth Parent sought the Democratic nomination. Kelly won the Democratic nomination.

District 38
Incumbent Democrat Abe Jones has represented the 38th district since 2021.

District 39
Incumbent Democrat James Roberson has represented the 39th district since his appointment on January 11, 2021. He was elected to a full term.

Districts 40-59

District 40
Incumbent Democrat Joe John has represented the 40th district since 2017. Marguerite Creel unsuccessfully challenged John for the Democratic nomination. John defeated former representative Marilyn Avila in the general election.

District 41
Incumbent Democratic Deputy Minority Leader Gale Adcock has represented the 41st district since 2015. Adcock retired to run for the North Carolina Senate. Wake County Commissioner Maria Cervania won the open seat.

District 42
Incumbent Democrat Marvin Lucas has represented the 42nd district since 2001. Naveed Aziz unsuccessfully challenged Lucas for the Democratic nomination.

District 43
Incumbent Republican Diane Wheatley has represented the 43rd district since 2021. Former Representative Elmer Floyd won the Democratic nomination.

District 44
Incumbent Democrat Billy Richardson has represented the 44th district since 2015. Richardson didn't seek re-election. Charles Smith won the Democratic nomination and ran unopposed in the general election.

District 45
Incumbent Republican John Szoka has represented the 45th district since 2013. Szoka originally announced that he would retire to run for Congress, but he switched races and chose to run for the Cumberland County Commission. Keith Byrd, Chris Davis, and 2020 nominee Frances Jackson sought the Democratic nomination. Jackson won the Democratic nomination and then defeated Republican nominee Susan Chapman in the general election.

District 46
Incumbent Republican Brenden Jones has represented the 46th district since 2017.

District 47
Incumbent Democrat Charles Graham has represented the 47th district since 2011. Graham is retiring to run for Congress. Jarrod Lowery won the Republican nomination. Charles Townsend won the Democratic nomination.

District 48
Incumbent Democrat Garland Pierce has represented the 48th district since 2005.

District 49
Incumbent Democrat Cynthia Ball has represented the 49th district since 2017.

District 50
Incumbent Democrat Graig Meyer has represented the 50th district since 2013. Meyer is retiring to run for North Carolina Senate. Renee Price won the Democratic nomination, defeating Matt Hughes.

District 51
Incumbent Republican John Sauls has represented the 51st district since 2017.

District 52
The new 52nd district includes the homes of incumbent Republicans Jamie Boles, who has represented the 52nd district since 2009, and Ben Moss, who has represented the 66th district since 2021. Moss defeated Boles to win the Republican nomination.

District 53
Incumbent Republican Howard Penny Jr. has represented the 53rd district since 2020. Brian Hawley is challenging Penny for the Republican nomination.

District 54
Incumbent Democratic Minority Leader Robert Reives has represented the 54th district since 2014. Republican former Chatham County commissioner Walter Petty and Craig Kinsey are seeking the Republican nomination.

District 55
Incumbent Republican Mark Brody has represented the 55th district since 2013. Brandon Smith is challenging Brody for the Republican nomination.

District 56
Incumbent Democrat Verla Insko has represented the 56th district and its predecessors since 1997. Insko isn't seeking re-election. Jonah Garson and Allen Buansi are seeking the Democratic nomination.

District 57
Incumbent Democrat Ashton Clemmons has represented the 57th district since 2019.

District 58
Incumbent Democrat Amos Quick has represented the 58th district since 2017.

District 59
Incumbent Republican Jon Hardister has represented the 59th district since 2013. He is running for re-election.  Eddie Aday and Sherrie Young are seeking the Democratic nomination.

Districts 60-79

District 60
Incumbent Democrat Cecil Brockman has represented the 60th district since 2015.

District 61
Incumbent Democrat Pricey Harrison has represented the 61st district and its predecessors since 2005.

District 62
Incumbent Republican John Faircloth has represented the 62nd district and its predecessors since 2011.

District 63
Incumbent Democrat Ricky Hurtado has represented the 63rd District since 2021. Ed Priola, former Representative Stephen Ross, and Peter Boykin sought the Republican nomination, with Ross winning the primary and then defeated Hurtado in the general election.

District 64
Incumbent Republican Dennis Riddell has represented the 64th District since 2013.

District 65
Incumbent Republican Reece Pyrtle has represented the 65th district since his appointment on August 11, 2021. He is running for re-election. Joseph A. Gibson III is challenging Pyrtle for the Republican nomination. Jay Donecker and Gary L. Smith are seeking the Democratic nomination.

District 66
The new 66th district is based in north central Wake County and has no incumbent. State Senator Sarah Crawford won the Democratic nomination defeating Wesley Knott and Frank (Jeremiah) Pierce. Crawford easily won the general election.

District 67
Incumbent Republican Wayne Sasser has represented the 67th District since 2019.

District 68
Incumbent Republican David Willis has represented the 68th District since 2021.

District 69
Incumbent Republican Dean Arp has represented the 69th District since 2013.

District 70
Incumbent Republican Pat Hurley has represented the 70th District since 2007. Brian Biggs defeated Hurley for the Republican nomination.

District 71
Incumbent Democrat Evelyn Terry has represented the 71st District since 2013. She is retiring. Kanika Brown won the Democratic nomination, defeating David M. Moore and Frederick N. Terry. Brown was unopposed in the general election.

District 72
Incumbent Democrat Amber Baker has represented the 72nd District since 2021.

District 73
The new 73rd district includes portions of eastern Cabarrus County. The district includes the home of incumbent Republican Larry Pittman, who has represented the 83rd district and its predecessors since 2011. Prior to the completion of redistricting, Pittman announced that he wouldn't seek re-election. Brian Echevarria won the Republican nomination, defeating Catherine Whiteford and Parish Moffitt.

District 74
Incumbent Republican Jeff Zenger has represented the 74th District since 2021. Carla Catalan Day won the Democratic nomination, defeating Sean Lew.

District 75
Incumbent Republican Donny Lambeth has represented the 75th District since 2013.

District 76
Incumbent Republican Harry Warren has represented the 76th district and its predecessors since 2011.

District 77
The new 77th district includes the homes of incumbent Republicans Julia Craven Howard, who has represented the 77th district and its predecessors since 1989, and Lee Zachary, who has represented the 73rd district since 2015. Zachary unsuccessfully ran for the North Carolina Senate.

District 78
Incumbent Republican Allen McNeill has represented the 78th District since 2012. He retired. Neal Jackson won the Republican nomination, defeating David Ashley and Cory Bortree.

District 79
Incumbent Republican Keith Kidwell has represented the 79th district since 2019. Ed Hege unsuccessfully challenged Kidwell for the Republican nomination.

Districts 80-99

District 80
Incumbent Republican Sam Watford has represented the 80th District since 2021.

District 81
Incumbent Republican Larry Potts has represented the 81st District since 2017.

District 82
Incumbent Republican Kristin Baker has represented the 82nd district since 2020

District 83
The new 83rd district includes portions of eastern Cabarrus County and southern Rowan County and has no incumbent. Kevin Crutchfield won the Republican nomination, defeating Grayson Haff and Brad Jenkins. Crutchfield was unopposed in the general election.

District 84
Incumbent Republican Jeffrey McNeely has represented the 84th District since 2019.

District 85
Incumbent Republican Dudley Greene has represented the 85th District since 2021.

District 86
Incumbent Republican Hugh Blackwell has represented the 86th District since 2009.

District 87
Incumbent Republican Destin Hall has represented the 87th District since 2017.

District 88
Incumbent Democrat Mary Belk has represented the 88th District since 2017.

District 89
Incumbent Republican Mitchell Setzer has represented the 89th District and its predecessors since 1999. Benjamin Devine and Kelli Weaver Moore unsuccessfully challenged Setzer for the Republican nomination.

District 90
Incumbent Republican Sarah Stevens has represented the 90th District since 2009. Benjamin Romans unsuccessfully challenged Stevens for the Republican nomination.

District 91
Incumbent Republican Kyle Hall has represented the 91st District since 2015. James Douglas and Stephen L. James unsuccessfully challenged Hall for the Republican nomination.

District 92
Incumbent Democrat Terry Brown has represented the 92nd District since 2021.

District 93
Incumbent Republican Ray Pickett has represented the 93rd district since 2021. He is running for re-election.

District 94
Incumbent Republican Jeffrey Elmore has represented the 94th District since 2013.

District 95
Incumbent Republican Grey Mills has represented the 95th District since 2021.

District 96
Incumbent Republican Jay Adams has represented the 96th District since 2015.

District 97
Incumbent Republican Jason Saine has represented the 97th District since 2011.

District 98
Incumbent Republican John Bradford has represented the 98th district since 2021.

District 99
Incumbent Democrat Nasif Majeed has represented the 99th District since 2019.

Districts 100-120

District 100
Incumbent Democrat John Autry has represented the 100th District since 2017.

District 101
Incumbent Democrat Carolyn Logan has represented the 101st District since 2019.

District 102
Incumbent Democrat Becky Carney has represented the 102nd District since 2003.

District 103
Incumbent Democrat Rachel Hunt has represented the 103rd District since 2019. Hunt is retiring to run for the North Carolina Senate. Former representative Bill Brawley is seeking the Republican nomination. Laura Budd won the Democratic nomination, defeating Ann Harlan. Budd defeated Brawley in the general election.

District 104
Incumbent Democrat Brandon Lofton has represented the 104th District since 2019.

District 105
Incumbent Democrat Wesley Harris has represented the 105th District since 2019.

District 106
Incumbent Democrat Carla Cunningham has represented the 106th District since 2013.

District 107
Incumbent Democrat Kelly Alexander has represented the 107th District since 2009. Vermanno Bowman unsuccessfully challenged Alexander for the Democratic nomination.

District 108
Incumbent Republican John Torbett has represented the 108th District since 2011.

District 109
Incumbent Republican Donnie Loftis has represented the 109th District since his appointment on November 1, 2021. Lauren Bumgardner Current, John Gouch, and Ronnie Worley unsuccessfully challenged Loftis for the Republican nomination.

District 110
Incumbent Republican Kelly Hastings has represented the 110th District since 2011.

District 111
Incumbent Republican Speaker of the House Tim Moore has represented the 111th District since 2003.

District 112
The new 112th district is based in eastern Mecklenburg County and has no incumbent. Former representative Tricia Cotham won the Democratic nomination, defeating Jay Holman, Yolanda Holmes, and former Representative Rodney Moore. Cotham won the general election.

District 113
The new 113th district includes the homes of incumbent Republicans Jake Johnson, who has represented the 113th District since 2019, and David Rogers, who has represented the 112th District since 2016. Both Rogers and Johnson are seeking re-election.

District 114
The new 114th district includes the home of incumbent Democrat John Ager, who has represented the 115th District since 2015. Ager isn't seeking re-election.

District 115
The new 115th district includes the home of incumbent Democrat Brian Turner, who has represented the 116th District since 2015. Turner isn't seeking re-election. Pratik Bhakta won the Republican nomination, defeating Sherry M. Higgins.

District 116
The new 116th district includes the home of incumbent Democrat Caleb Rudow, who has represented the 114th District since 2022.

District 117
Incumbent Republican Tim Moffitt has represented the 117th District since 2020. Moffitt is retiring to run for North Carolina Senate. Jennifer Capps Balkcom won the Republican nomination, defeating Dennis Justice and Chelsea Walsh.

District 118
Incumbent Republican Mark Pless has represented the 118th District since 2021.

District 119
Incumbent Republican Mike Clampitt has represented the 119th District since 2021.

District 120
Incumbent Republican Karl Gillespie has represented the 120th District since 2021. He is running for re-election.

Notes

References

External links

North Carolina House of Representatives
House of Representatives
2022